The Nanjing Yingtian Avenue Yangtze River Tunnel, formerly Nanjing Yangtze River Tunnel, is a tunnel under the Yangtze River in Nanjing, China. The tunnel connects the Pukou District to Jiangxin Island in the city of Nanjing. Construction of the tunnel began in 2005. The tunnel broke through in 2009 and was opened in May 2010. The tunnel has renamed on 20 December 2019.

The road continues over the Jiajiang Bridge, crossing the smaller Jiajiang branch of the river, into the Jianye District of Nanjing.

See also
 Yangtze River bridges and tunnels

References

Road tunnels in China
Transport in Jiangsu